Nena is a 2014 German-Dutch romantic drama film directed by Saskia Diesing that was awarded the 2014 Golden Calf for best director as well as best actress, and was noted with a Special Mention at the 2015 Berlinale. The film's North American premiere was celebrated at the Mill Valley Film Festival in San Rafael, California on 16 October 2015.

Set in the Netherlands in 1989, the film is inspired by Diesing's own experiences of adolescence, as well as her father's battle with multiple sclerosis.

Cast
 Abbey Hoes as Nena
 Gijs Blom as Carlo
 Uwe Ochsenknecht as Martin, Nena's father
 Monic Hendrickx as Martha, Nena's mother
 André Jung as Paul
 Magdalena Helmig as nurse
 Jelmer Ouwerkerk as catcher

References

External links

2014 films
2014 romantic drama films
Dutch romantic drama films
2010s Dutch-language films
German romantic drama films
2010s German-language films
Films shot in the Netherlands
Films shot in Germany
2014 multilingual films
Dutch multilingual films
German multilingual films
2010s German films